Serge A. Storms is the main protagonist in most of Tim Dorsey's novels (and appears in all of them to date). His name is a pun on storm surge. Most often described as "intense" in personality, he is a vagrant with a voracious intellect and an encyclopedic knowledge of Florida history, but prone to periods of "focus" that lead him to commit brutal - and often elaborately planned and staged - acts of violence.

Description 
In most of Dorsey's books, Serge is in his mid-forties. He is described as tall and thin, but muscular, with dark hair, shot through with gray. 
Serge has been diagnosed with a variety of mental illnesses, and has been prescribed a "cocktail" of drugs to keep him stable. These are effective, but he often refuses to take them, since he dislikes their effects. Free from the drugs' influence, he quickly becomes manic and obsessive about trivial things; he frequently acts as an extremely eccentric tour guide for whoever happens to be handy. Despite his psychological disorders, Serge is for the most part a charismatic, likable person (he can be viewed as a somewhat more liberal version of Joseph Heller's Yossarian).

When an event or person offends his extremely strong (and subjective) sense of justice, however, he can quickly fly into a homicidal rage; he has committed a string of murders for which the police pursue him as a serial killer.  Serge acts as an independent vigilante who dispenses rough, creative and immediate death penalties for low-life criminals, somewhat in the style of Death Wish (and its sequels) starring Charles Bronson.

All aspects of the history of Florida, whether political, ecological, or sociological, are of intense interest to Serge.  He is often seized with a sudden urge to visit landmarks, although their significance is frequently personal or related to popular culture, rather than historical. Serge usually documents such visits with copious numbers of photographs and keeps a box full of Florida-related memorabilia.

Serge also has a varied taste in music, ranging from the Beatles and the Rolling Stones, all fitting nicely with the tone of his character.

A confessed coffee addict, Serge is relentlessly upbeat and energetic.  He possesses a childlike sense of excitement and is almost always outgoing and friendly, even to those he murders.  He often corners people at random and spouts long, stream-of-consciousness diatribes that involve Florida trivia, social commentary and/or his bizarre sexual history.

In Orange Crush, while suffering a bout of amnesia, Serge, under an alias at the time, takes a small job in the mail room of the Florida Legislature, and soon has worked his way up to being the Governor's press secretary, largely because he is the only employee in the Legislature's entire workforce that can compose speeches without spelling or grammar errors.

Serge has started a personal religion based on football coach Don Shula, where salvation is obtained by successfully eating the 48-ounce steak at Shula's Steakhouse.

Serge appears to be partly inspired by Travis McGee, a fictional, Florida based, independent "salvage consultant" and crime-solver featured in many novels by John D. MacDonald.

Age
Serge was born during the Cuban Missile Crisis.  It is possible that he ages in real time, though it has never been clarified.  In Triggerfish Twist, Serge has turned 35, then nine books later, in Hurricane Punch, he's 44.  Being 44 causes him to go through a midlife crisis, causing him to have a religious awakening, and to go on a comeback killing spree.

Family
Storms' great-great-grandfather came to the US in the 1880s from Cuba. He worked as a reader in a cigar factory in Ybor City, but left after his boss disproved of the material he was reading to the other workers. He then ran a bolita lottery for a local gang. The game was supposed to be fixed, and the gang killed him when he made a mistake in the scheme.

Serge was named after his grandfather Sergio, a con artist who shared some of his grandson's passion for historical trivia. Sergio also seemed to share Serge's sense of ethics, as one of his last major cons involved swindling money from investors who themselves swindled the residents of a farming community in Alabama. Sergio was thought to have committed suicide when Serge was a child, but during the novel Cadillac Beach it's discovered that he is still alive. The elder Storms had a heart attack a few months before his grandson's 44th birthday, and died after a short stay in hospital.

Storms' father Pablo was a Cuban American jai alai player who was more popular for his unpredictability than his skill at the sport; he died when he hurled a pelota that rebounded and struck him forcefully in the head. This occurred when Serge was very young, and left his mother a widowed single mother. She had an affair with another jai alai player from Spain, which resulted in pregnancy. Since she could barely cope with one child, and had no support from the father (he went back to Spain), she reluctantly gave up Serge's half-brother for adoption. He was adopted by Mabel Mahoney, who lived a few streets away from the Storms.

Ford Oelman is Serge's other half-brother, the second child given up for adoption by his mother. Oelman was raised in Alabama, and did not find out about the adoption until he was an adult. He was reunited with Sergio when the older man was in Alabama, but did not meet with Serge until after their grandfather had died. Ford moved to California with his friend Mark to fulfill his ambition of becoming a screenwriter.

In Electric Barracuda, it is revealed that Serge has another half-brother. It is revealed that Serge's mother had an affair with another jai alai player from Spain, which resulted in pregnancy. Since she was unable to cope with one child, and had no support from the father (he went back to Spain), she gave up her second son for adoption.[4] Both half-brothers were raised mere blocks apart in 
Riviera Beach, often playing together as adolescents at the same playgrounds.

In Torpedo Juice, Serge marries Molly, who turns out to be a serial killer as well. In a later book, Serge has divorce papers in the glove compartment of the car he is driving, filled out and awaiting Molly's signature.

Companions
In the books Florida Roadkill and Triggerfish Twist, Serge's companions are a cold-hearted stripper named Sharon Rhodes and an idiotic drug addict named Seymour "Coleman" Bunsen. Although Sharon and Coleman are killed in Florida Roadkill, they both appear in the later novel Triggerfish Twist, which takes place sometime before the events of Florida Roadkill.

Coleman reappears in Torpedo Juice, and has been in every novel since.

Serge and Coleman meet Sharon's sister Rachel in Atomic Lobster.

Serge meets Lenny Lipowicz in Hammerhead Ranch Motel. Lipowicz, a Don Johnson lookalike, shares many of Coleman's characteristics. Lenny continues as Serge's companion in Cadillac Beach and The Stingray Shuffle.  To date, other than a brief appearance in Atomic Lobster, Lenny has not appeared in any later books.

References

Storms, Serge A.
Novel series
Fictional characters from Miami